The Brilliance H530 sedan is a mid-size sedan (D) produced by Brilliance Auto positioned above the Brilliance H330 compact sedan. The Brilliance 530 concept debuted at the 2011 Shanghai Auto Show in April 2011, while the production version, renamed to Brilliance H530 was officially listed on the Chinese market later on 29 August 2011. Pricing ranges from 79,800 yuan to 125,800 yuan.

2014 facelift

Brilliance H530 sedan went through a facelift that debuted on the 2014 Beijing Auto Show. The facelift introduced a new grille, new headlights, and new front and rear bumpers. The facelifted Brilliance H530 was launched on the China car market before the end of April 2014 with prices ranging from 65,000 to 95,000 yuan. However, the new design language of Brilliance H530, which represent the letter 'zhong' in Chinese, can be easily mistaken with a BMW 3 Series.

References

External links
Brilliance H530 website

H530
Cars of China
mid-size cars
Front-wheel-drive vehicles
Cars introduced in 2011